"The Candidate" is the 14th episode of the American Broadcasting Company's sixth season of the serial drama television series Lost and 117th episode overall. The episode aired on May 4, 2010, on ABC in the United States. The episode was written by Elizabeth Sarnoff and Jim Galasso and directed by Jack Bender. The episode is centered on Jack Shephard and John Locke.

In the flash-sideways timeline, Jack Shephard (Matthew Fox) tries to find out how John Locke (Terry O'Quinn) was paralyzed. In 2007, Jack and his group betray the Man in Black (also O'Quinn), but not without falling into his plans.

Plot

2004 (flash-sideways timeline)
After being successfully operated on by Jack Shephard (Matthew Fox), John Locke (Terry O'Quinn) awakens at the hospital. Jack tells Locke that he may be a candidate for a new surgical treatment to repair his pre-existing paralysis and asks Locke how he wound up in his paraplegic state. However, Locke declines the offer. In order to find out more about Locke's paralysis, Jack visits dentist Dr. Bernard Nadler (Sam Anderson) and asks for the dental records from an emergency oral surgery performed on Locke about three years previously. Bernard refuses to breach confidentiality, but tells him that a man named Anthony Cooper (Kevin Tighe) was brought in along with Locke three years ago. Jack goes to a nursing home and visits Anthony Cooper, who is Locke's father in a vegetative state. Claire Littleton (Emilie de Ravin) arrives at the hospital to see Jack. She shows Jack a music box that their father (John Terry) said he especially wanted her to have. Jack then invites Claire to come and stay at his house, stating to Claire that they are not strangers, but rather family. As Locke is preparing to leave the hospital, Jack approaches him and tells him that he went to see Locke's father so that he could find out why he doesn't want the surgery. Locke reveals to Jack that the accident that made him paralyzed was a plane crash; he had just qualified for his pilot's license and his father was his first passenger. Jack tells Locke his father is "gone" and that punishing himself won't bring him back. Locke still refuses Jack's offer and leaves.

2007 (original timeline)
Following the events of "The Last Recruit", Jack awakens on Hydra Island with Sayid Jarrah (Naveen Andrews) by his side. The Man in Black arrives and tells them that James "Sawyer" Ford (Josh Holloway), Claire Littleton, Kate Austen (Evangeline Lilly), Frank Lapidus (Jeff Fahey), Hugo Reyes (Jorge Garcia), Sun Kwon (Yunjin Kim) and Jin Kwon (Daniel Dae Kim) have been taken prisoner by Charles Widmore (Alan Dale). The Man in Black plans to help them escape, run for the Ajira plane and leave the island before Widmore knows what is happening. While Jack agrees to help, he insists that he himself will not leave the island. At Hydra Station, Widmore has Sawyer's group thrown inside the animal cages. Sayid turns off the camp's generator, bringing down the sonar fences which had been keeping the Man in Black at bay. The Man in Black then attacks as the Smoke monster, allowing Jack to free Sawyer's group. After reuniting with Sayid, they head into the jungle to find the Ajira plane. The Man in Black arrives at the plane site before the group, and inspects the interior of the plane after killing Widmore's guards. The Man in Black reveals to the group that Widmore has rigged the plane with C4. Unable to take the risk of using the plane, the Man in Black decides to escape using Widmore's submarine. As they head to the docks, Sawyer asks Jack to stop the Man in Black from getting on board the sub.

At the docks, the survivors manage to board the submarine while Widmore's men attack from the jungle. Kate is shot during the ensuing gun fight, but Jack manages to get her on board after pushing the Man in Black into the water. He gets back out of the water and begins to shoot down the last of Widmore's men. In order to prevent the Man in Black from entering, Sawyer has the sub take off without Claire.

On the sub, Jack discovers the Man in Black has planted the C4 in his bag and has set a timer to detonate. Unable to reach the surface in time, Sayid attempts to defuse the bomb. However, Jack tells Sawyer to let the timer reach zero, believing that nothing will happen to them because the Man in Black is unable to kill them himself. Jack theorizes that the Man in Black united the candidates because he needed them all dead in order to leave the island, and has come up with a plan that will trick them into killing one another by mistrusting each other. Sawyer is unconvinced and pulls the bomb's wires, causing the speed of the bomb's countdown to accelerate. Sayid tells Jack where to find Desmond Hume (Henry Ian Cusick) and runs to the back of the sub with the bomb. The bomb detonates, killing Sayid and causing a massive explosion that proceeds to flood the sub. Frank is knocked out by a door as it gives way to the water. Sun is pinned down by fragments of the submarine. Hurley exits the sub with a wounded Kate, while Jin, Sawyer, and Jack try to help Sun. After Sawyer is knocked unconscious, Jin convinces Jack to leave with Sawyer. Jin continues to try to free Sun despite her pleas for him to go, but to no avail. He tells Sun that he won't leave her. They then embrace as water floods the submarine, drowning them while holding hands.

Jack, Sawyer, Kate, and Hurley regroup at a nearby beach, and mourn those who died. Meanwhile, at the docks, the Man in Black tells Claire that the sub has sunk and there are survivors. He then departs to "finish what [he] started."

Production
The episode features the deaths of 3 main cast members, the highest of any episode in the series. Showrunners Damon Lindelof and Carlton Cuse described the episode as "brutal". Regarding the mass deaths of the characters, Lindelof stated "now you know this show is willing and capable of killing anyone." Cuse also added "There is no ambiguity. [The Man In Black] is evil and he has to be stopped... When we watched the death scenes ourselves, it was brutal. [But] the story always comes first."

Reception

The episode received critical acclaim. Review aggregate website Metacritic gave the episode a score of 92 out of 100, indicating "Universal Acclaim". The score was up on the previous episode's score of 73. Maureen Ryan of Chicago Tribune gave a perfect score, stating "Not only were the island events compelling, they neatly tied into the Sideways themes of trust and penance." James Poniewozik of Time also rated the episode perfect, calling it "heartbreaking, and horrifying, and breathtaking, and in some ways maddening." IGN's Chris Carbot praised the episode as well, saying "the story continues to deliver thrilling moments." However, he criticized the pacing of the flash-sideways storyline, describing it as "moving at a snails pace when compared to events occurring on the island." Overall, he gave the episode a score of 9.2. Emily VanDerWerff of Los Angeles Times deemed the episode as "one of the greatest episodes of the show ever for pure adrenaline rush, right up there with Through the Looking Glass and Exodus, Parts 1 and 2."

Many critics expressed shock regarding the deaths of the characters. Alan Sepinwall of Star Ledger thought the episode "drastically accelerated the pace of the unhappy endings." Chris Carbot stated "Sayid's death was a fitting end to his story. He had been on course to redeem himself ever since switching over to Team Smokie and was thankfully given the opportunity to go out in grand fashion ... Jin and Sun's demise came as a total shock. In fact, I'm still having a hard time processing the fact that they're actually dead, at least in the regular timeline." Sam McPherson of TV Overmind deemed the episode as "having great and terrible deaths."

References

External links

"The Candidate" at ABC

Lost (season 6) episodes
2010 American television episodes